This is a List of players of Basque pelota ordered by the variant of Basque pelota they are renowned, and without taking into account their active time or their nationality.

Cesta-Punta 
 Jesús Abrego
 José de Amézola y Aspizúa
 Joseph Apesteguy
 Francisco Churruca, Patxi 
 Maurice Durquetty
 Etchegaray
 Koteto Ezkurra
 Fernand Forgues
 Francisco Villota
Aniceto Sagastizabal "Gasti"

Handball

A 
 Imanol Agirre
 Julian Albizuri
 Iñigo Altuna
 Martin Alustiza
 Jon Apezetxea
 Unai Apeztegia
 Alexis Apraiz
 Arturo Arbizu
 Jokin Argote
 Ignacio Artamendi
 Thierry Harizmendi, Arizmendi
 Fernando Arretxe, Arretxe I
 Iker Arretxe, Arretxe II
 Asier Arruti
 Mariano Juaristi, Atano III
 Auxkin Perez

B 
 Iosu Baleztena
 Abel Barriola
 Aritz Begino
 Mikel Belloso
 Alberto Beloki, Beloki II
 Rubén Beloki, Beloki I
 Oinatz Bengoetxea, Bengoetxea VI
 Hodei Beobide
 Asier Berasaluze, Berasaluze IX
 Pablo Berasaluze, Berasaluze VIII

C 
 Miguel Capellán
 Ismael Chafee

D 
 Alberto del Rey
 Iñigo Diaz

E 
 Andoni Eguskiza
 Aitor Elkoro
 Inaxio Errandonea
 Jokin Errasti
 Iñaki Esain
 Iñaki Eskudero
 Patxi Eugi
 Pedro Martínez de Eulate

G 
 Enrike Galartza, Galartza V
 Xabier Galartza, Galartza VI
 Miguel Gallastegui
 Sebastien Gonzalez
 Mikel Goñi, Goñi II
 Fernando Goñi, Goñi III

I 
 Jose Migel Iturriotz
 Luis Ibarlucea Guerricabeitia

J 
Mark Johnson

K 
 Juantxo Koka

L 
 Iñaki Larralde
 Oskar Lasa, Lasa III
 Aritz Laskurain
 Iñigo Leiza
 Scott Laswell

M 
 Juan Martínez de Irujo
 Aratz Mendizabal, Mendizabal I
 Oier Mendizabal, Mendizabal II

N 
 Jorge Nagore
 Iñigo Benito, Nalda III

O 
 Asier Olaizola, Olaizola I
 Aimar Olaizola, Olaizola II
 Jabier Oteiza
 Iñaki Otxandorena

P 
 Pampi Laduche
 Iñigo Pascual
 Patxi Ruiz
 Kepa Peñagarikano

R 
 Raimundo Blanco, Rai
 Juan Ignacio Retegi, Retegi I
 Julián Retegi, Retegi II
 Julen Retegi, Retegi Bi
 Austin Roth

S 
 Ekaitz Saralegi

T 
 Augusto Ibáñez, Titín III
 Francisco Larrañaga, Txiquito de Iraeta
 Indalecio Sarasqueta, Txiquito de Éibar

U 
 Mikel Unanue
 Xabier Urberuaga
 Rober Uriarte
 Pablo Urrizelki

W 
 Waltary Agustí, Waltari

X 
 Yves Salaberry, Xala

Z 
 Oier Zearra
 Aitor Zubieta

Laxoa

Pala 
 Juan Pablo García
 Óscar Insausti

See also 
 Asegarce, pelota company
 Aspe, pelota company

 
Players